Deewar is an Indian television series that aired on DD National channel. The series was also shown on TV Asia channel in the United States.

Plot
The show is based on the story of a guy named Purshottam, who is in jail. He has been in prison for the last ten years. It is said that although his term is a lifer and that means a minimum of fourteen years, there is a possibility of him being released within the next six months. Purshottam is in prison due to his conviction for the crime of murder.

Cast
 Kulbhushan Kharbanda ... Purshottam Singh (Eldest son and the main character, who is in jail)
 Smita Jaykar ... Aparna (Purshottam's wife) 
 Amita Nangia ... Pakhi (Purshottam's elder daughter)
 Neha Mehta... Pallavi (Purshottam's younger daughter) 
 Anju Mahendru ... Gaaytri (The second wife of Purshottam)
 Sushil Parashar ... Maadhav Pattak (Gaatri's brother)
 Mukesh Khanna ... Vikram Singh (Purshottam's brother, and the other main character) 
 Asawari Joshi ... Jaya (Vikram's wife)
 Vaquar Shaikh ... Rahul (Son of Vikram) 
 Resham Tipnis ... Pinky (Vikram's daughter) 
 Avtar Gill ... Dhanraj Singh (Villain, who is Purshottam's cousin) 
 Sanjay Batra ... Jayant (Another Villain)
 Alok Nath ... Krishan Kant (Childhood friend of Vikram) 
 Sulabha Arya ... Geeta (Krishan's wife) 
 Mamik Singh ... Arjun (Aggressive son of Krishen, who is in love with pinky) 
 Anita Kulkarni ... Meera (Krishan's daughter, who would do anything for her parents and married Rahul later) 
 Rakesh Bedi ... Goldie (Household's manager---funny and confused)
 Sanjeev Seth... Gautam (Pakhi's lover)

References

External links
Official Website

Indian television soap operas
DD National original programming